Asylum is a 2014 American horror comedy film directed by Todor Chapkanov and starring Stephen Rea, Bruce Payne, Hristo Shopov, and Caroline Ford. The film was released to DVD in Japan on April 4, 2014 and was released in the United States on June 2, 2015. Asylum is part of After Dark's "After Dark Originals" series and stars Stephen Rea as a man who must stop his brother from releasing the forces of darkness upon the world.

Plot
The film follows a riot squad that enters an insane asylum to try to deal with a hostage situation involving some of the inmates. The group is quickly overwhelmed by the patients, who quickly attack the squad members. The resulting chaos causes the group to lose two of their members and the situation turns more tense when they realize that they are completely cut off from the outside world. Not only are all of the doors locked, but none of their communication devices seem to work properly. It is at this point that they realize that they aren't fighting against normal mental patients, but ones that have been possessed by a dark and evil force. Things take a darker turn when one group member discovers that the leader of this group is his own brother.

Cast

Stephen Rea as McGahey
Bruce Payne as Lieutenant Sharp
Hristo Shopov as Father Richard
Caroline Ford as Halloway
Steve Toussaint as Sergeant Powell
Jason Wong as Lim
Valentin Ganev	as Priest
Joe Montana as Barnett
Dimo Alexiev as Tall Intense Patient
Anton Trendafilov as Deep Voice Man
Velimer Velev as Bald Patient
Radoslav Ignatov as Wilder
Ulyana Chan as Attractive Nurse
Stefan Shyerev	as Marduk
Iana Kuzova as Dimarino
Curtis Nordstrom as Gilmartin
Edward Joe Scargill as Phillips

Production
The film's script was written by horror writer and director Chris Mancini, who pitched Asylum to After Dark. Mancini intended to serve as the movie's director, only for After Dark to instead assign Chapkanov as the movie's director and move the film's production to Bulgaria. Mancini's script was heavily re-written and altered from its original state and according to some review websites such as DVD Verdict and HorrorNews.net, After Dark enlisted Mancini to insert comedy into the film in an effort to salvage the production due to them seeing Chapkanov's finished film as poor in quality.

Reception
Influx Magazine panned Asylum, writing that ""It’s ultimately a rather weak affair (and really difficult to grade knowing the average viewer walking into this coldly will have an entirely different take on the result), but despite the best efforts of Mancini and friends to salvage this mess, I think the patient is lost and they should have just pulled the plug." HorrorNews.net criticized the film as being "a mess, from the moment the film starts, you can see it and feel it".

References

External links

2014 comedy horror films
American comedy horror films
2010s English-language films
2010s American films